The Leichhardt Falls is a plunge waterfall on the Leichhardt River in the Gulf Country region of North West Queensland, Australia.

Location and features
The falls vary in intensity from a raging torrent of water in the wet season to a mere trickle towards the end of the dry season. The falls are not renowned for their height but for their stepped nature and breadth.

The falls and river are named after Ludwig Leichhardt.

See also

 List of waterfalls of Queensland

References

External links

 

Waterfalls of Queensland
North West Queensland
Plunge waterfalls